Stobhill is a district in the Scottish city of Glasgow. It is situated north of the River Clyde. 
Part of Springburn, it gives its name to Stobhill Hospital.

Areas of Glasgow
Springburn